Roster is a remote scattered crofting township, in Caithness, Scottish Highlands and is in the Scottish council area of Highland.

Roster is located 2 miles north of the coastal village of Lybster and 1 mile south of Upper Camster.

Populated places in Caithness